Thijs Hendriks (born 5 February 1985) is a Dutch professional footballer who plays for SV DFS mainly as a forward.

Club career 

Hendriks kicked off his career with NEC in 2004. The following year he joined non-league Achilles '29. In his long spell with the club, it had many promotions, going to Eerste Divisie in 2013. In October 2014, he was appointed club captain, succeeding Twan Smits.

References

External links 
 
 NEC Archive
 Voetbal International profile
 

1985 births
Living people
Association football forwards
Dutch footballers
NEC Nijmegen players
Eredivisie players
Achilles '29 players
Derde Divisie players
Eerste Divisie players
People from Heumen
Footballers from Gelderland